Dornith Doherty (born 1957) is an American photographer.

Doherty graduated with a Bachelor of Arts degree from Rice University in 1980 and from Yale University an MFA degree in photography in 1988.

Her work is included in the collections of the Museum of Fine Arts, Houston, and the Minneapolis Institute of Arts Minneapolis.

She was a 2012 Guggenheim foundation fellow.

References

Living people
1967 births
20th-century American photographers
21st-century American photographers
20th-century American women artists
21st-century American women artists